Fo Deuk Revue is an album by David Murray released on the Canadian Justin Time label. Recorded in 1996 and released in 1997, the album features performances by Murray with Darryl Burgee, Ousseynou Diop, Assane Diop, Craig Harris, Robert Irving III, Abdou Karim Mané, Oumar Mboup, Hugh Ragin, Doudou N'Diaye Rose, Moussa Séné, El Hadji Gniancou Sembène and Jamaaladeen Tacuma.

Reception
The Allmusic review awarded the album 2.5 stars.

Track listing
 "Blue Muse" (Irving, Murray) - 8:59  
 "Evidence" (Murray) - 5:58  
 "One World Family" (Awadi, Barry, Gaye, Murray) - 8:42  
 "Too Many Hungry People" (Irving) - 5:16  
 "Chant Africain" (Traditional) - 6:59  
 "Abdoul Aziz Sy" (Dieuf Dieul, Gaye) - 6:29  
 "Village Urbana" (Awadi, Barry, Irving) - 7:15  
 "Thilo" (Dieuf Dieul, Gaye) - 6:20  
Recorded on June 3 & 4, 1996 at Studio 2000, Senegal

Personnel
David Murray - tenor saxophone, bass clarinet
Didier Awadi (Positive Black Soul) - rap
Amiri Baraka - poetry recitation 
Amiri Baraka Jr. - voice
Amadou Barry (Positive Black Soul) - rap
Darryl Burgee - drums
Ousseynou Diop - drums
Assane Diop - guitar and xalam
Tidiane Gaye - voice
Craig Harris - trombone
Robert Irving III - piano
Hamet Maal - voice
Abdou Karim Mané - bass
Oumar M’boup - djembe and percussion
Hugh Ragin - trumpet
Doudou N'Diaye Rose - sabar and voice
El Hadji Gniancou Sembène - keyboard
Moussa Séné - vocals and percussion
Junior Soul - voice
Jamaaladeen Tacuma - bass guitar

References 

1997 albums
David Murray (saxophonist) albums
Justin Time Records albums